Pedro Xague was a Roman Catholic prelate who served as Bishop of Nisyros and Auxiliary Bishop of Cádiz.

Biography
Pedro Xague born in Trujillo, Spain and ordained a priest in the Order of Preachers. On 4 Sep 1560, he was appointed during the papacy of Pope Pius IV as Bishop of Nisyros and Auxiliary Bishop of Cádiz. It is not certain how long he served in these positions although fellow Auxiliary Bishop of Cádiz, Jerónimo Clavijo, was appointed as Bishop of Nisyros in 1564.

References

External links and additional sources
 (for Chronology of Bishops) 
 (for Chronology of Bishops)  

16th-century Roman Catholic bishops in the Republic of Venice
Bishops appointed by Pope Pius IV
Dominican bishops